The Asian palm civet (Paradoxurus hermaphroditus), also called common palm civet, toddy cat and musang, is a viverrid native to South and Southeast Asia. Since 2008, it is IUCN Red Listed as Least Concern as it accommodates to a broad range of habitats. It is widely distributed with large populations that in 2008 were thought unlikely to be declining.
In Indonesia, it is threatened by poaching and illegal wildlife trade; buyers use it for the increasing production of kopi luwak.

Characteristics 

The Asian palm civet's long, stocky body is covered with coarse, shaggy hair that is usually greyish in colour. It has a white mask across the forehead, a small white patch under each eye, a white spot on each side of the nostrils, and a narrow dark line between the eyes. The muzzle, ears, lower legs, and distal half of the tail are black, with three rows of black markings on the body. It weighs . Its anal scent glands emit a nauseating secretion as a chemical defense when threatened or upset.

Distribution and habitat
The Asian palm civet is native to India, Nepal, Bangladesh, Bhutan, Myanmar, Sri Lanka, Thailand, Singapore, Peninsular Malaysia, Sabah, Sarawak, Brunei Darussalam, Laos, Cambodia, Vietnam, China, the Philippines, and the Indonesian islands of Sumatra, Java, Kalimantan, Bawean, and Siberut. It was introduced to Irian Jaya, the Lesser Sunda Islands, Maluku, and Sulawesi. Its presence in Papua New Guinea is uncertain.

It usually inhabits primary forests, but also occurs at lower densities in secondary and selectively logged forest.

It is also present in parks and suburban gardens with mature fruit trees, fig trees, and undisturbed vegetation. Its sharp claws allow climbing of trees and house gutters. In most parts of Sri Lanka, palm civets are considered a nuisance since they litter in ceilings and attics of common households, and make loud noises fighting and moving about at night.

Evolution 
Palawan and Borneo specimens are genetically close, so the Asian palm civet on Palawan island might have dispersed from Borneo during the Pleistocene. It is possible that people later introduced Asian palm civet into other Philippines islands.

Behaviour and ecology

The Asian palm civet is thought to lead a solitary lifestyle, except for brief periods during mating. It is both terrestrial and arboreal, showing a nocturnal activity pattern with peaks between late evening until after midnight. It is usually active between dawn and 4:00 in the morning, but less active during nights when the moon is brightest.

Scent marking behaviour and olfactory response to various excretions such as urine, feces, and secretion of the perineal gland differs in males and females. Scent marking by dragging the perineal gland and leaving the secretion on the substrate was most commonly observed in animals of both sexes. The duration of the olfactory response varied and depended both on the sex and excretion type. The palm civet can distinguish animal species, sex, familiar and unfamiliar individuals by the odor of the perineal gland secretion.

Feeding and diet
The Asian palm civet is an omnivore feeding foremost on fruits such as berries and pulpy fruits. It thus helps to maintain tropical forest ecosystems via seed dispersal. It eats chiku, mango, rambutan, and coffee, but also small mammals and insects. It plays an important role in the natural regeneration of Pinanga kuhlii and P. zavana palms at Gunung Gede Pangrango National Park.
It also feeds on palm flower sap, which when fermented becomes palm wine, a sweet liquor ("toddy"). Because of this habit, it is called the toddy cat.

Reproduction 

Due to its solitary and nocturnal habits, little is known about its reproductive processes and behaviour. In March 2010, a pair of palm civets was observed when attempting to mate. The pair copulated on the tree branch for about five minutes. During that period, the male mounted the female 4–5 times. After each mounting, the pair separated for a few moments and repeated the same procedure. After completion of mating, the pair frolicked around for some time, moving from branch to branch on the tree. The animals separated after about six minutes and moved off to different branches and rested there.

Threats

Hunting
In some parts of its range Asian palm civets are hunted for bushmeat and the pet trade. In southern China it is extensively hunted and trapped. Dead individuals were found with local tribes where it is killed for its meat, in Coimbatore, Tamil Nadu, and Agra, Uttar Pradesh, between 1998 and 2003 in India.

The oil extracted from small pieces of the meat, kept in linseed oil in a closed earthen pot and regularly sunned, is used indigenously as a cure for scabies.

Kopi luwak 

Kopi luwak is coffee prepared using coffee beans that have been subjected to ingestion and fermentation in the gastrointestinal tract of the Asian palm civet, which is called luwak in Indonesia. Caffeine content in both Arabica and Robusta luwak coffee is lower than in unfermented coffee. Large deformation mechanical rheology testing revealed that civet coffee beans are harder and more brittle in nature than their control counterparts indicating that digestive juices enter into the beans and modify the micro-structural properties of these beans. Proteolytic enzymes cause substantial breakdown of storage proteins.

Kopi luwak is traditionally made from the faeces of wild civets, however, due to it becoming a trendy drink, civets are being increasingly captured from the wild and fed coffee beans to mass-produce this blend. Many of these civets are housed in battery cage systems which have been criticised on animal welfare grounds. The impact of the demand for this fashionable coffee on wild palm civet populations is yet unknown but may constitute a significant threat. In Indonesia, the demand for Asian palm civets appears to be in violation of the quota set for pets.

Conservation 
Paradoxurus hermaphroditus is listed on CITES Appendix III. There is a quota in place in Indonesia, precluding trade from certain areas, setting a cap on the number of civets that can be taken from the wild, and allowing only 10% of those removed from the wild to be sold domestically. This quota is largely ignored by hunters and traders and is not enforced by authorities. This species has become popular as a pet in Indonesia in recent years, causing a rise in the numbers found in markets in Java and Bali. The majority of the animals sold as pets originate from the wild. The high numbers of animals seen, lack of adherence to the quota and lack of enforcement of the laws are causes for conservation concern.

Taxonomy

Viverra hermaphrodita was the scientific name proposed by Peter Simon Pallas in 1777. It is the nominate subspecies and ranges in Sri Lanka and southern India as far north as the Narbada River.
Several zoological specimens were described between 1820 and 1992:
Viverra bondar by Anselme Gaëtan Desmarest in 1820 was a specimen from Bengal
Viverra musanga by Stamford Raffles in 1821 was a specimen from Sumatra
Viverra musanga, var. javanica by Thomas Horsfield in 1824 was a specimen from Java
Paradoxurus pallasii by John Edward Gray in 1832 was a specimen from India
Paradoxurus philippinensis by Claude Jourdan in 1837 was a specimen from the Philippines
P. h. setosus by Honoré Jacquinot and Pucheran in 1853
P. h. nictitans by Taylor in 1891 was a specimen from Odisha;
P. h. lignicolor by Gerrit Smith Miller Jr. in 1903
P. h. minor by John Lewis Bonhote in 1903
P. h. canescens by Lyon in 1907
P. h. milleri by Cecil Boden Kloss in 1908
P. h. kangeanus by Oldfield Thomas in 1910
P. h. sumbanus by Ernst Schwarz in 1910
P. h. exitus by Schwarz in 1911
P. h. cochinensis by Schwarz, 1911
P. h. canus (Miller, 1913)
P. h. pallens (Miller, 1913)
P. h. parvus (Miller, 1913)
P. h. pugnax (Miller, 1913)
P. h. pulcher (Miller, 1913)
P. h. sacer (Miller, 1913)
P. h. senex (Miller, 1913)
P. h. simplex (Miller, 1913)
P. h. enganus by Lyon, 1916
P. h. laotum by Nils Carl Gustaf Fersen Gyldenstolpe in 1917 was a specimen from Chieng Hai in north-western Thailand, and ranges from Myanmar to Indochina and Hainan;
P. h. balicus by Sody in 1933 was a specimen from Bali
P. h. scindiae by Pocock in 1934 was a specimen from Gwalior, and ranges in central India;
P. h. vellerosus by Pocock in 1934 was a specimen from Kashmir;
P. h. dongfangensis by Corbet and Hill in 1992
The taxonomic status of these subspecies has not yet been evaluated.

Local names

 Common palm civet, Mentawai palm civet
 toddy cat
 Musang or Alamid in the Philippines;
 Garong in Waray (Philippines)
 Musang in Malaysia and in Indonesia, in latter also Luwak;
 Motit, Amunin in the Gran Cordillera Central mountain range of northern Philippines;
"उदमांजर" in Marathi in Maharashtra
 Punugina Bekku, Kabbekku (ಪುನುಗಿನ ಬೆಕ್ಕು, ಕಬ್ಬೆಕ್ಕು) in Kannada;
 Punugu Pilli (పునుగు పిల్లి) in Telugu;
 Gondho Gokul, Bham, Bham Beral in Bengali, known as Shairel in Khulna; Khatash in Sylhet
 Marapatti or "മരപ്പട്ടി", translates as 'tree-dog' or 'wood-dog', in Malayalam;
 Beru in Tulu
 Punugu Poonai புனுகுப்பூனை in Tamil, also meaning 'musk cat';
 Johamal জহামাল in Assamese;
"Saliapatini" ଶାଳିଆପାତିନି in Odia;
 Bijju or Kabar Bijju in Hindi;
 Vaniyar  ᦠᦲᧃ in Gujarat;
 " Kandechor" कांडेचोर(meaning 'onion thief') in Konkan, Maharashtra.
  /  in Sinhala of Sri Lanka;
 Cầy vòi hương in Vietnamese;
 PuLi.ngaa maajjar in Konkani;
 Ii Hěn อีเห็น in Thailand;
 Hěn ເຫັນ  or Ngěn ເຫງັນ in Laos;
 Hěn ႁဵၼ်  in Shan of the Shan states, Myanmar;
 Hǐn ᦠᦲᧃ  in Tai Lü of Xishuangbanna, Yunnan, China;
 Hěn ᩉᩮ᩠ᨶ in Khün of Kengtung, Shan State, Myanmar;
 Hen ᥞᥥᥢᥴ in Tai Nuea of Dehong Dai and Jingpo Autonomous Prefecture, Yunnan, China.

In mythology
In Philippine mythology, the Bagobo people believe a being named Lakivot was said to be a huge and powerful palm civet who can talk. Lakivot defeated various monsters, including the one-eyed monster Ogassi and the busaw beings who guarded the Tree of Gold, which had the Flower of Gold that he sought. He was eventually transformed into a handsome young man, and married the person to whom he gave the Flower of Gold.

References

External links

Asian palm civet
Mammals of South Asia
Mammals of Southeast Asia
Carnivorans of Malaysia
Least concern biota of Asia
Asian palm civet
Taxa named by Peter Simon Pallas